Khoyrasol (also spelled Khayrashoal, Khoyrasole) is a village in Khoyrasol CD Block in Suri Sadar subdivision of Birbhum district in the Indian state of West Bengal.

Geography

Police station
Khoyrasol police station has jurisdiction over a part of Khoyrasol CD block.

CD block HQ
The headquarters of Khoyrasol CD block are located at Khoyrasol.

Demographics
As per the 2011 Census of India, Khayrashoal had a total population of 3,313 of which 1,709 (52%) were males and 1,604 (48%) were females. Population below 6 years was 334. The total number of literates in Khayrashoal was 2,214 (74.32% of the population over 6 years).

Transport
Panchra-Khoyrasol Road links Khoyrasol to NH 14 at Panchra.

Post Office
Khoyrasol has a delivery sub post office, with PIN 731125, under Suri head office. Branch offices with the same PIN are Babuijore, Barhra, Bhadulia, Geruapahari, Hazratpur, Jahidpur, Kankartala, Kendragoria, Nabasan, Nakrakonda, Pursundi, Rasa and Sagarbhanga.

Education
Sailajananda Falguni Smriti Mahavidyalaya was established at Khoyrasol in 1998. Affiliated to the University of Burdwan, it conducts under-graduate courses in arts.

Culture
Khoyrasol Milan Sangha Gramin Pathagar, a government-sponsored library, was established in 1951. It has its own pucca building.

References

Villages in Birbhum district